Fonyuy Leonard Nsohburinka is a Cameroonian singer (born August 31, 1990)  who is well known by his stage name Mr. Leo, he rose to fame after his single "E go beta" a hit aired in most Radio/TV stations in the country. Mr. Leo is an artist; in 2016, he received three awards at the Balafon Music Awards 2016 edition in Song of the Year, Revelation of the Year and Best Male Artist. He was nominated for the All Africa Music Awards (AFRIMA) in Lagos, Nigeria 2017 edition in the category of Best Male Central Africa. As part of his career, in March 2017 he became the brand ambassador of Itel Mobile in Cameroon.

Early life and education
Mr. Leo was born  Fonyuy Leonard Nsohburinka  on August 21, 1990, and grew up in a military camp (Warder Barracks) in Buea, Southwest Region (Cameroon). He is a member of the Nso people who grew up in a military ghetto. He is the 3rd child in a family of 4.

Career
 In 2016, Africa news aggregates AllAfrica.com published that, Mr. Leo passion in music started when he became a member of a school Choir Break Through voices Leo finally left the camp and moved to molyko the (heart of studies and entertainment) in South west region of Cameroon . There is time for everything, Leo, professional career started when he signed a recording deal with Alpha Better Records in 2015, in the same year, Alpha Better records released his debut single hit song titled (E go Beta) and in November 2015 his label released another of Mr.Leo single title On Va Gérer which means (we shall manage). Mr. Leo's career has earned the Cameroonian artist 5 awards in the following categories which include; best lyricist, best new artist, best video and best song with a message and best Cameroonian soul music. Leo was inspired by Seal, Lemar, 2face Idibia and others. Mr. Leo has been recognized by awards and nominations such as the African Entertainment Awards (USA), he was nominated for best Francophone artist and Best Male Single in Jamais-Jamais 2017. In 2017, he signed an endorsement deal with Itel Mobile as brand ambassador in Cameroon and he said {Big Deal being signed with itel Mobile, I’m blessed!.} Like any other artist, he has done collaboration with artists such as Wax dey , X-Maleya, Locko, Magasco, Hiro, Fanicko and others.

 In 2020, he founded the record label Lionn Production through which he produces Cameroonian artists Kameni and Gomez. He left  Alpha Beta records Label in July 2020, after 13 years.

In 2021, he was selected to part to be part of the Grammy Awards Recording Academy.

Personal life
Mr. Leo is still single.

Discography

Albums
 Love Original 2017  (13 Tracks)
 Lion of Africa (Jeey) 2021 (13 tracks)

Selected as single
  O'Leo (Colleta)  (2012)
  No Judge Me  (2012)
  E go Better  (2015)
  On Va Gerer  (2015)
  Femme  ft Rude Bway  (2015)
  C’est Faux  (2016)
  Kemayo 
 Jamais Jamais 
 Je T’aime ft Hiro (2016)
 Partout (2017)
Je suis désolé (2018)
On se connait pas (2018)
Je suis à toi (2018)
Patronne (2019)
Amen (2019)
Zege Zege (2020)
Asabe (2020)
Time (2020)
Jei Jei (2021)
Choisir (2022)

Collaboration
  X Maleya – Maria 
 Revolution – C’est Pas Ma Faute
 Better Featuring Wax Dey
 Que Ce Qui N’a Pas Marcher  featuring (Alpha Better Artists)
  Higher Higher Featuring (Alpha Better Artists)
 Fap Kolo Featuring Salatiel 
 Supporter  Featuring Locko –
 Love na Love Remix Featuring (Charly B)
  Clando   Featuring Blaise B and Salatiel
  Madame Tout le Monde  Featuring (Rhythmz )
 Jamais Jamais remix'' Featuring Flavour N'abania

Awards and recognition

See also 

List of Cameroonians
List of African musicians

References

1990 births
Living people
21st-century Cameroonian male singers
People from Bamenda
Cameroonian rappers